Pope Leo VII (died 13 July 939) was the bishop of Rome and nominal ruler of the Papal States from 3 January 936 to his death.

Election 
Leo VII's election to the papacy in 936, after the death of Pope John XI, was secured by Alberic II of Spoleto, the ruler of Rome at the time. Alberic wanted to choose the pope so that the papacy would continue to yield to his authority. Leo was the priest of the church of San Sisto Vecchio in Rome, thought to be a Benedictine monk. He had little ambition towards the papacy, but consented under pressure.

Pontificate
As pope, Leo VII reigned for only three years. Most of his bulls were grants of privilege to monasteries, especially including the Abbey of Cluny. Leo called for Odo of Cluny to mediate between Alberic and King Hugh of Italy. Odo was successful in negotiating a truce after arranging a marriage between Hugh's daughter Alda and Alberic. Leo VII also appointed Archbishop Frederick of Mainz as a reformer in Germany. Leo allowed Frederick to drive out Jews that refused to be baptized, but he did not endorse the forced baptism of Jews.

Leo VII died on 13 July 939, and was interred at St. Peter's Basilica. He was succeeded by Stephen VIII.

References 

 Opera Omnia by Migne Patrologia Latina with analytical indexes

Popes
939 deaths
Year of birth unknown
10th-century popes
Benedictine popes
Burials at St. Peter's Basilica